India competed at the 2004 South Asian Games held in Islamabad, Pakistan. In this edition of the South Asian Games, India ranked 1st with 103 gold medals and 182 in total.

2004 South Asian Games
2004
2004 in Indian sport